Grand Prix is a Czech film by director and screenwriter Jan Prušinovský. The film is a road movie and tells the story of two cousins who want to get into Formula 1 racing. One of them wins tickets to Spanish Grand Prix and they embark on a journey across Europe, but their journey is not without complications.

The main roles were played by Kryštof Hádek, Robin Ferro and Štěpán Kozub, Anna Kameníková, Marek Daniel, Eva Hacurová, Miroslav Donutil and Tatiana Dyková appeared in other roles.

The creation of the film was financially supported by the Czech State Cinematography Fund and Slovak Audiovisual Fund. The film premiered in Czech cinemas on 17 November 2022.

Plot
The dream of two cousins, Roman (Kryštof Hádek) and Emil (Robin Ferro), is to get to the Formula 1 races. Roman runs a dirty car dealership on the outskirts of the city, has three children and a wild wife (Anna Kameníková). Emil, a keen lover of order, runs his car workshop in the downtown and knows almost everything about cars. 

When one day Emil wins tickets to the Spanish Grand Prix in Barcelona in a televised contest, little does either of them know that their dream trip will soon turn into a wild ride across Europe. Especially when Štětka (Štěpán Kozub), Roman's friend and a local magnet for trouble, turns on them.

Cast
 Kryštof Hádek as Roman
 Robin Ferro as Emil
 Štěpán Kozub as Štětka
 Anna Kameníková as Iveta
 Marek Daniel as Holeček
 Miroslav Donutil as Štětka
 Eva Hacurová as Bílková
 Tatiana Dyková as Jindra
 Cyril Drozda as Šrejbr
 Michal Režný as Klimek
 Nikola Janković as Bogumil

References

External links
 
 Gran Prix on Voyo (in Czech)

2022 films
2022 drama films
Czech comedy-drama films
Czech road movies
2020s Czech-language films